The 2022 M&M's Fan Appreciation 400 was a NASCAR Cup Series race that was held on July 24, 2022, at Pocono Raceway in Long Pond, Pennsylvania. Contested over 160 laps on the  speedway, it was the 21st race of the 2022 NASCAR Cup Series season. Chase Elliott of Hendrick Motorsports would win the race after Denny Hamlin and Kyle Busch, who originally finished first and second respectively, were both disqualified for failing post-race technical inspection. Elliott became the first NASCAR driver to win a race after both the original first and second-place finishers were disqualified since 1955. Hamlin was also the first NASCAR Cup Series race winner to be disqualified since 1960, ending a 62-year streak. It was also the first disqualification of the Next Gen car since its debut earlier that year.

Report

Background

Pocono Raceway is a  oval speedway located in Long Pond, Pennsylvania, which has hosted NASCAR racing annually since the early 1970s. Nicknamed "The Tricky Triangle", the speedway has three distinct corners and is known for high speeds along its lengthy straightaways.

From 1982 to 2019, the circuit had two race weekends. In 2020, the circuit was reduced to one race meeting of two races. The first race was moved to World Wide Technology Raceway near St. Louis starting in 2022.

Entry list
 (R) denotes rookie driver.
 (i) denotes driver who is ineligible for series driver points.

Practice

Practice results

Qualifying

During the second round of qualifying, Kurt Busch spun and the car made tail to wall contact to the Turn 3 wall.  After further checkups on Sunday morning, he was medically disqualified and thereby suspended under a medical suspension that has continued to the remainder of the regular season.  Ty Gibbs took over the 45 car for the remainder of the regular season.

Qualifying results

Race

Stage Results

Stage One
Laps: 30

Stage Two
Laps: 65

Final Stage Results

Stage Three
Laps: 65

Race statistics
 Lead changes: 15 among 10 different drivers
 Cautions/Laps: 9 for 37
 Red flags: 0
 Time of race: 3 hours, 15 minutes and 59 seconds
 Average speed:

Media

Television
USA covered the race on the television side. Rick Allen, Jeff Burton, Steve Letarte, and Dale Earnhardt Jr. called the race from the broadcast booth. Kim Coon, Parker Kligerman, and Marty Snider served as pit reporters.

Radio
Radio coverage of the race was broadcast by Motor Racing Network (MRN) and was also simulcast on Sirius XM NASCAR Radio. Alex Hayden, Jeff Striegle, and Todd Gordon called the race in the booth when the field raced through the tri-oval. Dave Moody called the race from the Sunoco spotters stand outside turn 2 when the field raced through turns 1 and 2. Mike Bagley called the race from a platform inside the backstretch when the field raced down the backstretch. Kyle Rickey called the race from the Sunoco spotters stand outside turn 3. Steve Post and Chris Wilner worked pit road for MRN.

Standings after the race

Drivers' Championship standings

Manufacturers' Championship standings

Note: Only the first 16 positions are included for the driver standings.
. – Driver has clinched a position in the NASCAR Cup Series playoffs.

Notes

References

2022 MandM's Fan Appreciation 400
2022 NASCAR Cup Series
2022 in sports in Pennsylvania
July 2022 sports events in the United States